Big City Blues is a 1932 American pre-Code drama film directed by Mervyn LeRoy and distributed by Warner Bros. The film is based on the play New York Town by Ward Morehouse and stars Joan Blondell and Eric Linden, with uncredited early appearances by Humphrey Bogart and Lyle Talbot.

Original prints and copies of the motion picture are preserved in the collections of the  Library of Congress, the UCLA Film and Television Archive, and in other major film repositories.

Plot
Bud Reeves is a naive young man who lives in a small town in Indiana. After inheriting $1,100 ($ today) from his aunt, he decides to use the money to move to New York City to find a job and start a new life. His dog Duke follows him to the railroad station, and the station agent says he will take care of the pup but only as a loan, because he is certain that Bud will return home in a month or less, having spent some time in the city himself and being well aware how tough life can be there.

Once in New York, Bud rents a modest but spacious hotel room and soon meets his much older, slick-talking cousin Gibby. Gibby immediately begins to fleece Bud out of small amounts of his cash to buy things. He also introduces him to chorus girl Vida Fleet and her friend Faun. Bud quickly falls in love with Vida.

Trouble soon starts when Gibby purchases a large amount of liquor and champagne from a local bootlegger and arranges a party in Bud's room. In addition to Vida and Faun, others joining the party include Jackie Devoe and more chorus girls, as well as three men: Stacky, Shep, and Lenny. Later in the evening, after considerable drinking, Shep and a very drunk Lenny begin arguing about who will take unconscious Jackie home. A fight ensues; furniture is overturned; and lamps are broken. As the lights go out, Shep and Lenny continue their brawl. Bottles are also being wildly thrown and used as weapons in the darkened room. When the lights come back on, the revelers discover that Jackie, lying on a couch, is dead, killed by one of the bottles hitting her head. Everyone except Bud hurriedly leaves the hotel room, even Vida. The house detective, Hummel, soon discovers Jackie's body after seeing Vida, who has returned to get Bud. The young couple flees, but are later arrested along with some of the other partiers. All are finally cleared of any charges when back at the hotel Hummel finds the real killer, Lenny, whose corpse is hanging in a closet. Evidence shows that he committed the crime, and that in his guilt and remorse over Jackie's death he hanged himself.

After a tearful goodbye with Vida, Bud goes back to Indiana, to find Duke patiently waiting for him at the station (the station agent collects on a bet he made over this). A telegraph he sends via the agent indicates he intends to return to New York after saving enough money, presumably to marry Vida.

Cast
Joan Blondell as Vida Fleet
Eric Linden as Bud Reeves
Jobyna Howland as Serena Cartlich
Ned Sparks as "Stacky" Stackhouse
Guy Kibbee as Hummell, the house detective
Grant Mitchell as Station Agent
Walter Catlett as Cousin "Gibby" Gibboney
Inez Courtney as Faun
Thomas Jackson as Detective Quelkin
Uncredited Cast
Humphrey Bogart as Shep Adkins 
Josephine Dunn as Jackie DeVoe 
Evalyn Knapp as Jo-Jo 
Lyle Talbot as Len 'Lenny' Sully 
Sheila Terry as Lorna St. Clair
Gloria Shea as Agnes
Tom Dugan as Red
Betty Gillette as Mabel
Edward McWade as Baggage Master
Wallis Clark as Chief of Police
Selmer Jackson as Joe
Clarence Muse as Nightclub Singer 
J. Carrol Naish as Bootlegger 
Dick Powell as Radio Announcer (voice)

References

External links
 

allmovie/synopsis; Big City Blues

1932 films
1932 crime drama films
American crime drama films
American black-and-white films
1930s English-language films
American films based on plays
Films directed by Mervyn LeRoy
Films set in New York City
Warner Bros. films
1930s American films
Films scored by Bernhard Kaun
Films about inheritances